Mount Camel is a rural locality in the City of Greater Bendigo, Victoria named for the nearby Mount Camel.

References

Suburbs of Bendigo
Bendigo